R is the ratio of the hadronic cross section to the muon cross section in electron–positron collisions:

where the superscript (0) indicates that the cross section has been corrected for initial state radiation. R is an important input in the calculation of the anomalous magnetic dipole moment.  Experimental values have been measured for center-of-mass energies from 400 MeV to 150 GeV.

R also provides experimental confirmation of the electric charge of quarks, in particular the charm quark and bottom quark, and the existence of three quark colors.  A simplified calculation of R yields

where the sum is over all quark flavors with mass less than the beam energy. eq is the electric charge of the quark, and the factor of 3 accounts for the three colors of the quarks.  QCD corrections to this formula have been calculated.

Usually, the denominator in R is not the actual experimental μμ cross section, but the off-resonance theoretical QED cross-section: this makes resonances  more visibly dramatic than normalization by the  μμ cross section,  which is also greatly enhanced at these resonances (hadronic states, and Z boson).

Notes 

Scattering
Particle physics